Men of Athens is a 1962 young adult historical fiction book by author Olivia Coolidge. It consists of short stories about the men who lived during the Golden Age of Greece. It received a Newbery Honor Award in 1963. It also won the Horn Book Fanfare award.

Awards
Newbery Honor in 1963
Horn Book Award

External links
Men of Athens  at the Open Library

References

1962 short story collections
Young adult short story collections
Historical short story collections
Newbery Honor-winning works
Children's short story collections
Ancient Greece in fiction
1962 children's books